"If I Could Put Them All Together (I'd Have You)" is a song by American country singer George Jones.  Composed by Even Stevens, it was released as a single on Epic Records in 1977 and peaked at #24 on the Billboard country singles chart, a dismal showing for a George Jones record.  Despite being a "stone country" song that Jones promoted with several television appearances (including Marty Robbins' TV show), it failed to find a wider audience.

Chart performance

References

1977 singles
George Jones songs